Ilami is a 2016 Indian Tamil period drama film directed by J. Julian Prakash, based on the backdrop of Jallikattu. It features Yuvan and Anu Krishna in the lead roles, with Akhil and Ravi Mariya in supporting roles, and Kishore in a guest appearance. Ilami had a low profile theatrical release on 25 November 2016.

Cast
 Yuvan as Karuppu
 Anu Krishna as Ilami
 Akhil as Sadai Puli
 Ravi Mariya as Verayyan
 Kishore as a king (guest appearance)

Production
Julian Prakash revealed that he was inspired to make a film about vadam jallikattu as a result of his fascination with the sport, while growing up as a youngster in Madurai and called for more Tamil people to celebrate their culture. While rookie actors Yuvan and Akhil were cast in the film in the leading and lead negative roles, Anu Krishna, previously seen in Kaththi (2014), was signed on to portray the titular character. To resemble scenes from the year 1715, director Prakash and his team constructed a huge set in Talakona, a forested area in Andhra Pradesh. This came after the team trialled a smaller set at Theni, near Madurai, in Tamil Nadu, but found it difficult to find any place in the state that was untouched by 21st century development. To prepare for his role, actor Yuvan bulked up and grew long hair, to resemble a tribal settler from the 18th century.

Soundtrack
The music composed by Srikanth Deva.

Release 
The film had a low key theatrical release across Tamil Nadu in November 2016. Anupama Subramaniam of the Deccan Chronicle wrote "that the director has narrated his story neatly, without much deviation and executed it well" adding that "Srikanth Deva’s music, cinematography by Yuga and art direction by John Britto aids the narration in a big way, but the graphically generated bulls are tacky", while concluding "though there are few flaws, nevertheless the film is worth a watch!" A reviewer from the Hindustan Times, noted "Given the budget constraints of a small independent director, Prakash’s effort is laudable, though one felt disappointed with Yuvan’s wooden performance and Krishna was of course expressively engaging". Another reviewer pointed out the crew's amateur film making process was an evident drawback of the film.

References

External links 
 

2016 films
2010s Tamil-language films
Films set in ancient India
Indian historical drama films
Indian epic films
Films scored by Srikanth Deva